Sorolopha archimedias is a moth of the family Tortricidae first described by Edward Meyrick in 1912. It is found in Thailand, China, Sri Lanka, India, Java and Queensland, Australia.

Description
The wingspan is about 15 mm. Adults have brown forewings with a pale area at the apex with a white outline containing a large brown spot, and a white outlined brown area of erect scales at the back of the thorax.

Etymology 
The name refers to the brown arch of scales on the back of the thorax and is derived from Latin archi (meaning arch) and medias (meaning middle).

Biology
The larvae feed on Cinnamomum verum, Cinnamomum camphora, Syzygium aromaticum and Litsea glutinosa. They live in a silken web, spun between the leaves of the host plant.

References

Moths described in 1912
Olethreutini
Moths of Asia
Moths of Australia